Kujiejun (other spellings koojiejun/kojiejun) is a type of bamboo stove and is also a special term for "tea stove".

Popular during Song Dynasty, the bamboo windscreen stove frame would fit on top of a brazier.

Tea Ware
This is special name for a windscreen stove. This type of stove was also used during the Tang dynasty when tea was boiled.

See also
The Classic of Tea
Pictorial of Tea Ware
bamboo stove

References
Tea Terms 2010 中英文茶術語
Best Kitchen Product Reviews

Teaware
Cooking appliances